Dunshaughlin railway station is a proposed railway station intended to serve the town of Dunshaughlin in County Meath, Ireland.

The station had been planned to be built as part of the second phase of reinstatement of the Clonsilla-Navan line. However, as of 2012, these plans were deferred due to the reduction in the Exchequer capital investment programme. Dunshauglin was intended to be the first station on the Phase 2 section of the route, after the M3 Parkway park and ride station. The proposed route plans include 34 km of railway line, with stations at Dunshaughlin, Kilmessan, Navan town centre and a further station on the northern edge of Navan. In 2016, the National Transport Authority ruled that there was not a sufficient number of commuters to warrant a new station, but agreed to conduct a new study; a report was due be released in mid-2021. County councillors made representations to "ensure that the 'actual' population of Dunshaughlin" would be used in the determination of the need for a station.

Proposed location
The preferred route for Phase 2 of the extension of the Dublin–Navan railway line was published in March 2009; it was intended that for the most part it would follow the disused route to Navan. However, there was debate over the location of Dunshauglin station. Iarnród Éireann favoured the existing route, which carries the railway line approximately 1.5 km to the west of the town, on the other side of the Dunshauglin interchange of the M3 motorway. Some County Meath Councillors expressed a preference that the route of the line should be "as close to Ratoath and Dunshaughlin as possible" and that "potential users should not have to cross the R147 and M3 to get to a train station".

References

Iarnród Éireann stations in County Meath
Proposed railway stations in the Republic of Ireland